(also Kaneko Shigeri and later Yamataka Shigeri, sometimes incorrectly referred to as Shigeri Takayama) was a Japanese feminist and founder of the League for the Defense of Women's Rights. In 1952 she also took part in Chifuren, when it was formed, one of the largest women's organizations in Japan with more than 6 million members. She was also Chifuren's President.

Biography
Yamataka was born in Mie Prefecture. She began her career in Japan as a journalist. She worked at Kokumin Shinbun and Shufu no Tomo. With Fusae Ichikawa, she co-founded the Women's Suffrage Union (Women's Suffrage League) in Japan in 1924. They hoped to extend suffrage to women, but when the government passed the Men's Suffrage Law in 1924, women were excluded. Despite this, the Women's Suffrage Union continued its work for many years.

After the end of World War II, Yamataka continued her political activism. She worked for war pensions to be granted to widows of war veterans, and for children's rights. On August 25, 1945, Yamataka co-founded the Women's Committee on Postwar Policy (Sengo Taisaku Fujin Iinkai). The co-founders were Fusae Ichikawa, Tsuneko Akamatsu, and Natsu Kawasaki. The first meeting was on September 11, 1945, with over 70 women in attendance. Among the priorities of the organization were: welcoming returning soldiers, improving food production, increasing household savings, gaining suffrage for women over 20, establishing the right for women over 25 to run for office, reforming the local and central governments, and allowing women to hold jobs in the civil service.

When women gained suffrage in Japan in 1945, Yamataka ran for public office and was elected twice (1962-1971) to the House of Councillors, the upper house in the Diet of Japan, the country's federal government.

In 1952, Yamataka co-founded the National Federation of Regional Women's Organizations, known as Chifuren, in Japan. She eventually became President and remained in this role until her death in 1977. Chifuren was also active in promoting consumer protection and household economy.

See also

Feminism in Japan
Women's suffrage in Japan

References

Japanese feminists
Female members of the House of Councillors (Japan)
Members of the House of Councillors (Japan)
1899 births
1977 deaths
Writers from Mie Prefecture
20th-century Japanese women politicians
20th-century Japanese politicians
Japanese women journalists
20th-century journalists
20th-century Japanese women writers
20th-century Japanese writers
Politicians from Mie Prefecture
Japanese suffragists